Nancy Niles Lusk (October 12, 1953) is an American politician who served as a member of the Kansas House of Representatives from 2013 to 2021. Lusk represented the 22nd district.

References

External links
State Legislature Page
Ballotpedia

Democratic Party members of the Kansas House of Representatives
Women state legislators in Kansas
Living people
21st-century American politicians
21st-century American women politicians
1953 births